Ike Readon (born May 16, 1963) is a former American football defensive tackle. He played for the Miami Dolphins in 1987.

References

1963 births
Living people
American football defensive tackles
Hampton Pirates football players
Miami Dolphins players